Microdajidae is a family of crustaceans belonging to the class Tantulocarida. The family was previously place in class Hexanauplia.

Genera:
 Microdajus Greve, 1965
 Xenalytus Huys, 1991

A third genus, Xenodactylus, is sometimes placed in the family, but its status is doubtful.

References

Crustaceans
Crustacean families